Thea "Tjeertje" Bergers-Duif (born 13 September 1944) is a Dutch sprint canoer who competed in the late 1960s. Together with Mieke Jaapies she finished sixth in the K-2 500 m event at the 1968 Summer Olympics in Mexico City.

References

1944 births
Living people
Canoeists at the 1968 Summer Olympics
Dutch female canoeists
Olympic canoeists of the Netherlands
Sportspeople from Zaanstad
20th-century Dutch women
20th-century Dutch people